John Crossley (birth registered fourth ¼ 1956), also known by the nickname of "Jay Cee", is an English cricketer, and  professional rugby league footballer who played in the 1970s and 1980s.

Background
John Crossley's birth was registered in Pontefract, West Riding of Yorkshire

Playing career

Championship appearances
John Crossley scored a club record 35 tries for York Wasps in 1980/81 when they won the Championship Second Division title during the 1980–81 Rugby Football League season.

John Crossley played in Halifax's victory in Championship during the 1985–86 season.

Rugby League Premiership Final appearances
John Crossley played in Halifax's 10-38 defeat by Warrington in the 1985–86 Rugby League Premiership Final during the 1985–86 season at Elland Road, Leeds, on Sunday 18 May 1986.

County Cup Final appearances
John Crossley played as an  interchange/substitute, i.e. number 14, (replacing  Terry Day) in York's 8-18 defeat by Bradford Northern in the 1978 Yorkshire County Cup Final during the 1978–79 season at Headingley Rugby Stadium, Leeds, on Saturday 28 October 1978, in front of crowd of 10,429.

Notable tour matches
John Crossley played  in Fulham R.L.F.C.'s 5-22 defeat by Australia in the 1982 Kangaroo tour of Great Britain and France tour match during the 1982–83 season at Craven Cottage, Fulham, London, on Sunday 14 November 1982, in front of crowd of 10,432.

Club career
John Crossley made his début for York on Sunday 21 August 1977, and holds York's tries in a season record with 35 tries scored during the 1980–81 season, he made his début for Featherstone Rovers on Sunday 23 November 1986.

Honoured at York
John Crossley  is a York 'Hall of Fame' inductee.

Genealogical information
John Crossley is the son of the rugby league footballer who played in the 1950s for Castleford and Lock Lane ARLFC; John Crossley Sr.

References

1956 births
Living people
Bradford Bulls players
Castleford Tigers players
Cricketers from Pontefract
English cricketers of 1969 to 2000
English cricketers
English rugby league players
Featherstone Rovers players
Halifax R.L.F.C. players
London Broncos players
Rugby league five-eighths
Rugby league halfbacks
Rugby league players from Pontefract
Rugby league wingers
Wakefield Trinity players
York Wasps players
Wicket-keepers